2022 Indian communal violence may refer to:
April 2022 Indian communal violence
riots following the 2022 BJP Muhammad remarks controversy